Qala-e-Seraj is a palace located in Mihtarlam, Laghman Province, Afghanistan. It was built by Amir Habibullah Khan c. 1912–13 to spend his winters there. Local officials spent 22 million Afs to rebuild the castle in 2020.

Description
The castle has two buildings, four towers, and a mosque.

See also
List of castles in Afghanistan

External links
Qalat us-Seraj
Qala-e-Seraj Masjid

References

Forts in Afghanistan
Palaces in Afghanistan
Tourist attractions in Afghanistan
History of Laghman Province
Buildings and structures in Laghman Province